Lawal Adebowale Ismail (born 5 September 1991) is a Nigerian footballer who plays for Assyriska FF as a midfielder. He also holds a Swedish passport.

References

External links

1991 births
Living people
Nigerian footballers
Association football forwards
IFK Göteborg players
Syrianska FC players
Allsvenskan players
Superettan players
Swedish footballers
Vasalunds IF players
Degerfors IF players
Assyriska FF players